The École nationale supérieure is a French institute of higher learning.

École nationale supérieure des Beaux-Arts, Paris
École nationale supérieure des mines de Saint-Étienne
École nationale supérieure Louis-Lumière, Paris
École nationale supérieure des mines de Nancy
École nationale supérieure des arts décoratifs, Paris
École nationale supérieure des Mines de Paris
École nationale supérieure de l'électronique et de ses applications, Cergy-Pontoise
École nationale supérieure des mines de Nantes
École nationale supérieure de techniques avancées Bretagne, Brest
École nationale supérieure de Techniques Avancées
École Nationale Supérieure d'Arts et Métiers